In abstract algebra, a multiplicatively closed set (or multiplicative set) is a subset S of a ring R such that the following two conditions hold:
 ,
  for all .
In other words, S is closed under taking finite products, including the empty product 1.
Equivalently, a multiplicative set is a submonoid of the multiplicative monoid of a ring.

Multiplicative sets are important especially in commutative algebra, where they are used to build localizations of commutative rings.

A subset S of a ring R is called saturated if it is closed under taking divisors: i.e., whenever a product xy is in S, the elements x and y are in S too.

Examples
Examples of multiplicative sets include:
 the set-theoretic complement of a prime ideal in a commutative ring;
 the set , where x is an element of a ring;
 the set of units of a ring;
 the set of non-zero-divisors in a ring;
  for an ideal I.
 the Jordan–Pólya numbers, the multiplicative closure of the factorials

Properties
 An ideal P of a commutative ring R is prime if and only if its complement  is multiplicatively closed. 
 A subset S is both saturated and multiplicatively closed if and only if S is the complement of a union of prime ideals.  In particular, the complement of a prime ideal is both saturated and multiplicatively closed.
 The intersection of a family of multiplicative sets is a multiplicative set.
 The intersection of a family of saturated sets is saturated.

See also 
 Localization of a ring
 Right denominator set

Notes

References 
 M. F. Atiyah and I. G. Macdonald, Introduction to commutative algebra, Addison-Wesley, 1969.
 David Eisenbud, Commutative algebra with a view toward algebraic geometry, Springer, 1995.
 
 Serge Lang, Algebra 3rd ed., Springer, 2002.

Commutative algebra